The 2013–14 Macedonian Second Football League was the 22nd season since its establishment. It began on 10 August 2013 and ended on 17 May 2014.  This was the final season with 16 teams, because the Football Federation of Macedonia approved reducing the league to 10 teams. Therefore, the 3 teams from 7th and 9th position played relegation play-offs, and the 7 teams were directly relegated.

Participating teams 

1 Shkupi was in the first part of season participated as Korzo.

League table

Results 

Every team will play each other team twice (home and away) for a total of 30 matches each.

Relegation playoff

First round
The first Round included 8 clubs (3 from the Second League as well as the 5 winners of the Third Leagues) which were arranged in 4 pairs, playing one game on neutral field with the winners advancing to the second round. The games will be played on 31 May 2014.

Second round
The Second Round included 4 clubs, the four winners of the matches in the first round: Miravci, Mladost Carev Dvor, Pobeda Junior and Vardar Negotino. In this round they were playing two games, both on neutral field with the winners getting a spot in the 2014–15 Macedonian Second League. The games will be played on 4 and 8 June 2014.

First leg

Second leg

Miravci won 6–0 on aggregate

Mladost Carev Dvor won 4–3 on aggregate

See also
2013–14 Macedonian Football Cup
2013–14 Macedonian First Football League
2013–14 Macedonian Third Football League

References

External links
Football Federation of Macedonia 
MacedonianFootball.com 

Mace
2
Macedonian Second Football League seasons